Battery Point is a suburb of the city of Hobart, Tasmania, Australia. It is immediately south of the central business district. It is in the local government area of City of Hobart.

Battery Point is named after the battery of guns which were established on the point in 1818 as part of the Hobart coastal defences. The battery was situated on the site of today's Princes Park.  The guns were used to fire salutes on ceremonial occasions but were never called upon to repel an invasion.  The battery was decommissioned after an 1878 review of Hobart's defences found that its location would tend to draw an enemy's fire onto the surrounding residential neighbourhood.  The site was subsequently handed over to the Hobart City Council as a place of recreation and amusement.  When the Council carried out works to beautify the park in 1934, they discovered tunnels which had served as a magazine for the original battery. In 1973, a green ban was placed by the Builders Labourers Federation to prevent destruction of certain buildings by developers.

The area is generally known as one of the city's more prestigious suburbs, with many large and extravagant homes and apartment blocks. It adjoins the waterfront Salamanca area as well as the nearby prestigious suburb of Sandy Bay. 

Probably the most significant is Arthur Circus with its cottages, mostly originally constructed for the officers of the garrison.

Battery Point is accessible via Hampden Road, which runs from Sandy Bay Road from the edge of the city.

Battery Point residents have been the centre of controversy in recent years, demanding noise restrictions and other measures aimed at safeguarding a sheltered lifestyle.

Population
In the 2016 Census, there were 1,997 people in Battery Point.  65.3% of people were born in Australia and 76.9% of people only spoke English at home. The most common responses for religion were No Religion 47.9% and Anglican 16.1%.

Notable people
Francis Butler (1856–1885), cricketer
Errol Flynn (1909–1959), Hollywood film actor, who was born in Battery Point at the Queen Alexandra Hospital
Andrew Inglis Clark (1848–1907), Tasmanian Supreme Court judge, barrister, engineer, politician and author of the Australian constitution

References

Suburbs of Hobart
Green bans
Localities of City of Hobart